The Rosedale Plantation is a plantation in Vaughn, Yazoo County, Mississippi. The Victorian cottage is 3000 square feet.

History
The cottage was built circa 1870 for Milton Cyrus Ewing and his wife, Augusta Anderson. It burned down in 1891, but it was rebuilt shortly after with pine lumber Ewing ordered from  J. J. White of Columbia.

The exterior remains the same nowadays except for its roof which was reshingled in 2010.

Heritage significance
It has been listed on the National Register of Historic Places since July 20, 2011.

References

Houses on the National Register of Historic Places in Mississippi
Houses in Yazoo County, Mississippi
Plantations in Mississippi
National Register of Historic Places in Yazoo County, Mississippi